Maral Yazarloo-Pattrick (born Maral Yazarloo, ;‎ 18 November 1981) is an Iranian-Indian motorcyclist, fashion designer, artist, marketer, motivational speaker and campaigner of women’s rights.

Early life and education 
Maral Yazarloo was born in Kelarabad, Iran. She was raised and received her education in Iran. She secured a bachelor's degree in Business Development (BBD) from the University of Tehran. In 2004, she relocated to India to pursue her master's degree in Business Administration (MBA) and PhD in Marketing from the University of Pune.

Corporate career 
Yazarloo started her corporate career with India-based realty company Panchshil in 2006 and served as Head of Retail and Marketing for 11 years till March 2017.

Fashion design and art 
Yazarloo studied fashion design in Milan and started the fashion label ‘House of Maral Yazarloo’ in 2012. She made her debut as a fashion designer at a show in Paris and also showcased her collections in Rome, London, India and Dubai. Yazarloo has also showcased her ceramic art and canvas paintings at exhibitions in Iran and India. Her flagship store and design workshop are located in Pune, India.

Biking 
Her first bike was a Harley Davidson 48 and then the Harley Nightrod Special.

She is the first woman to own Ducati & BMW GS motorcycles in India, was the HOG (Harley Owners Group) Officer (2015) and the Vice President of the Ducati Club (2016). She started the riding group ‘Ladies of Harley’ and is the founder of the first-ever Ladies Super Bike Club ‘Lady Riders of India’.

Solo World Biking Tour – 'Ride To Be One' 

In March 2017, Yazarloo-Pattrick commenced a solo world biking tour across the seven continents with no backup or team.

The ride started from India and through 18 consecutive months, Yazarloo covered 64 countries and traversed over 110,000 km. This solo bike ride is set to break stereotypes and create the world record for women bikers in Asia and Middle East.

Yazarloo is campaigning for Iranian women to get permission and licences to ride motorbikes. She is also an advocate for awareness about rape and domestic violence on women.

Influence 
 Yazarloo-Pattrick has been a speaker and panelist on industry forums that include the Retail Forum in Las Vegas, LFS (Luxury, Fashion & Style) Conclave in India and ADL Milan. She has also been a motivational speaker at forums that include TEDx SIUKirkee Pune, Virginia Commonwealth University of Qatar and Symbiosis International University.

In February 2017, Yazarloo-Pattrick received the ‘Pune’s Most Powerful’ award from Femina Magazine, India.

In 2018, BBC News listed Yazarloo-Pattrick as one of their '100 Inspiring and Influential Women from around the world for 2018'. In 2020, she won The Economic Times 'ET GEN NEXT Icons Award'.

Personal life 
Yazarloo-Pattrick has lived in Pune, India since 2004. An ardent traveller, Yazarloo-Pattrick has backpacked across 67 countries around the world. She married Alexander William Pattrick in October 2017 at Machu Picchu in Peru, while on her solo world biking ride. During the last 6 months of her ride, she was pregnant. Her daughter, Nafas Elizabeth Pattrick was born in November 2018. Yazarloo-Pattrick resides in New Delhi, India.

Media coverage 

A wild ride, Mumbai Mirror, September 2020
Celebrating Women’s Equality Day with these 5 incredibly talented women, The Page India, August 2020
Maral Yazarloo: Around The World With A Baby Bump, On An 800cc Motorbike, SheThePeople, July 2020
Meet Maral Yazarloo, The Woman Who Rode A Superbike Around The World With A Baby Bump, ScoopWhoop, July 2020
This Mom Travelled The World On A Motorbike While Pregnant, BabyGaga, July 2020
Give it up for these gen-next leaders!, Times of India, February 2020
The biker girls come zooming in, oHeraldo, December 2019
Women bikers scorch a path in the male-dominated space, Economic Times, December 2019
Iran may allow women to ride motorcycles, thanks to Maral Yazarloo, Times Now, August 2019
6 Kickass ADV Women to Watch in 2019, Adventure Rider, July 2019
Vroom! Make way for 'bikernis', hijab rider, Nyoooz, February 2019
Big Biking Commune 2019: Women bikers Roshni Misbah, Veena Shetty, Maral Yazarloo tell us how they break the stereotype, Indian Express, February 2019 
Bikes, Technology And World Tours, In Conversation With Female Biker Dr. Maral Yazarloo, News18, December 2018
Riders You Should Know: Dr. Maral Yazarloo-Pattrick Rideapart.com, November 2018
BBC 100 Women 2018: Who is on the list? BBC News, November 2018
Özgürlük tutkusu dünya turuna çıkardı Motosiklet, July 2018
Özgürlük tutkusu dünya turuna çıkardı Deniz Kartalı, July 2018
Özgürlük duygusu dünya turuna çıkardı Milliyet, July 2018
10 BADASS lady bikers of India Cartoq.com, July 2018
This woman rider travels across the world for her cause The Hindu, May 2018
This Pune woman biking solo across the globe is proof why travelling alone is the best thing to do Times Now, April 2018
This Pune woman is biking solo across the 7 continents Conde Nast Traveller, March 2018
'Ride to Be One' - Peru Fast Bikes India, February 2018
Lady Biker Maral Yazarloo on World Tour Dainik Bhaskar, October 2017
Iranian Woman from Pune Biking Across 45 Nations Eisamay, October 2017
This Badass Pune-Based Woman Is Touring All 7 Continents On Her Kickass Bike That Scoop, October 2017
Lady Biker Maral Yazarloo on World Tour Khabar24x7, October 2017
Latest News on Lady Biker Maral Yazarloo Divya Bhaskar Marathi, October 2017
Lady Biker Maral Yazarloo on World Tour Divya Bhaskar Marathi, October 2017
This 35-year-old Iranian woman is biking her way through 45 countries Economic Times, October 2017 
Like a boss: This Pune-based Iranian woman is biking her way through all 7 continents Hindustan Times, October 2017
This superbiker has a message and she is riding 100,000 km just to drive it home Ocider, September 2017
Ride to be One Campaign: Super Biker Duo’s Journey to 45 Countries in 7 Continents in 18 Months India.com, September 2017
18 Months, 7 Continents, 45 Countries, One Epic Road Trip : Ride to be One Motoroids, September 2017
“Ride To Be One” Dr. Maral Yazarloo and Pankaj Trivedi take on a motorbiking Journey across the Seven Continents NRInews, March 2017
Made off Dreams | Maral Yazarloo TEDxSIUKirkee, January 2017
Meet Maral Yazarloo: The woman who owns four superbikes including a Harley & a Ducati! Economic Times, October 2016
The last roar of a lioness Mumbai Mirror, April 2016
Courtyard by Marriott Pune City Centre Hosts Femina Wedding Times Fashion Fiesta 2016 Market Wired, March 2016
7 Female Bike Riding Groups Making the Nation Proud India TV, March 2016
Biking is for anyone who loves the thrill of it: Women on wheels Times of India, December 2015
Review of Maral Yazarloo House of MEA Deja Vu Collection at Fashion Scout London Fashion For Royals, September 2015
Women bikers intrude male bastion, come out with flying colours Business Insider, July 2015
Harley Davidson – Maral Yazarloo Freedom Story Iroon, December 2014
The Gundi on the Night Rod Man's World India, October 2014
Fashion Forward day 1: A coat of many talents Gulf News, October 2014
Fashion Forward Season 4: Meet the new designers Gulf News, October 2014
Fashion Forward Dubai, The Mecca of Middle East Fashion Splash Magazine, October 2014
In High Gear The Telegraph, June 2014
The Freedom Stories -- Maral Yazarloo, Harley-Davidson owner, Seven islands chapter, Mumbai Harley-Davidson India, November 2013
Maral Yazarloo Verve Magazine, April 2012

External links 
 Official Website
 Official Biking Website

References 

BBC 100 Women
1981 births
Living people
Sportspeople from Mazandaran province
People from Pune
Iranian fashion designers
Indian people of Iranian descent
Iranian emigrants to India
Iranian women fashion designers
Iranian sportswomen